Dalston railway station is a railway station serving the village of Dalston near Carlisle in Cumbria, England. It is owned by Network Rail and managed by Northern Trains.

History
It became an unstaffed halt in 1967, but has kept its period stone waiting shelter on the northbound platform, lattice footbridge and main buildings on the opposite side (the latter are in private commercial use). It is also one of the last active freight locations on this route - an oil terminal on the eastern side of the line just south of the station receives regular trainloads of fuel oil from Grangemouth Refinery in Scotland. Two crossovers operated from ground frames located at the station are used for shunting purposes when trains require access to the terminal sidings.

Facilities
Along with most other stations on the line, it is unstaffed, meaning that passengers need to purchase tickets on the train. Step-free access is available to both platforms and train running information is provided by telephone and timetable posters. Digital information screens and a ticket machine are also being installed by Northern in 2019 as part of a rolling station improvement plan in the area.

Services

During the evening, the station is served by an hourly service between Carlisle and Whitehaven. All services are operated by Northern Trains.

Rolling stock used: Class 156 Super Sprinter and Class 158 Express Sprinter

References

External links

 
 

Railway stations in Cumbria
DfT Category F2 stations
Former Maryport and Carlisle Railway stations
Northern franchise railway stations
Railway stations in Great Britain opened in 1843
Dalston, Cumbria